Zlatko Čordaš is a male former international table tennis player and coach from Serbia and Croatia.

He won a bronze medal at the 1969 World Table Tennis Championships in the Swaythling Cup (men's team event) with Istvan Korpa, Antun Stipančić, Dragutin Šurbek and Edvard Vecko for Yugoslavia.

Two years later he won a bronze medal at the 1971 World Table Tennis Championships in the Swaythling Cup (men's team event) with Milivoj Karakašević, Korpa, Stipančić and Šurbek.

He also won two European Table Tennis Championships medals. In 2004 he was appointed a Competition Manager at the 2004 World Team Table Tennis Championships in Doha.

See also
 List of table tennis players
 List of World Table Tennis Championships medalists

References

Yugoslav table tennis players
Serbian male table tennis players
Croatian male table tennis players
Croatian table tennis coaches
1948 births
Living people
World Table Tennis Championships medalists